The Tenth Federal Electoral District of Chiapas (X Distrito Electoral Federal de Chiapas) is one of the 300 Electoral Districts into which Mexico is divided for the purpose of elections to the federal Chamber of Deputies and one of 12 such districts in the state of Chiapas.

It elects one deputy to the lower house of Congress for each three-year legislative period, by means of the first past the post system.

District territory
The Tenth District of Chiapas comprises the municipalities of
Ángel Albino Corzo, Cintalapa, Jiquipilas, La Concordia, Montecristo de Guerrero, Villa Corzo and Villaflores.

The district's head town (cabecera distrital), where results from individual polling stations are gathered together and collated, is the city of Villaflores.

Previous districting schemes

1996–2005 district
Between 1996 and 2005, the Tenth  District was located in a different region of Chiapas, closer to the Guatemala border. It covered the municipalities of Ángel Albino Corzo,
Amatenango de la Frontera, Bejucal de Ocampo, Bella Vista, Chicomuselo, El Porvenir, La Grandeza, Mazapa de Madero, Motozintla and Siltepec.

The Tenth District of Chiapas was created in 1996. Between 1979 and 1996, Chiapas only had nine federal electoral districts. The Tenth District elected its first deputy, to the 57th Congress, in 1997.

Deputies returned to Congress from this district

LVII Legislature
1997–2000:  Manuel Hernández Gómez (PRI)
LVIII Legislature
2000–2003:  Carlos Rodolfo Soto Monzón (PRI)
LIX Legislature
2003–2006:  Belisario Herrera Solís (PRI)
LX Legislature
2006–2009:  Martín Ramos Castellanos (PRD)

References and notes 

Federal electoral districts of Mexico
Government of Chiapas